Šest dana juna is the soundtrack album for the movie with the same title. It was the last Idoli release. The album was not a commercial success as the fans were expecting a new release, which did not appear as the band did not exist any more.

History 
After the Ljubljana show in 1984 Idoli decided to split up. In the meantime, Jugoton asked Vlada Divljan to work with Idoli on the soundtrack album for Dinko Tucaković's movie Šest dana juna. Divljan agreed to write the music, but he insisted to record it separately from other Idoli members who would record their parts.

The album was released in 1985 and credited as an Idoli album. The musicians involved with the project were Idoli members Srđan Šaper (vocals), Kokan Popović (drums), both bassists Zdenko Kolar and Branko Isaković and guests Piko Stančić and Boban Đorđević (both on drums), keyboardists Đorđe Petrović and Dragan Ilić, guitarist Dragomir Mihajlović Gagi and saxophonist Vuk Vujačić. The script demanded one chanson and one folk music number, so Mišo Kovač and Jahija Gračanlić (also known as the Cosmic Bosnian) appeared on the album and in the movie with the tracks "Da je duži moj dan" and "Ja je zovem meni da se vrati". The rest of the tracks were Idoli songs except "Samo me gledaj i budi tu", which is a cover of Gilbert Bécaud's hit, “Je t'appartiens.”

Since the movie is set in the 1960s, the band recorded tracks at various locations to get the music similar to the sixties sound. Instrumental tracks on the album are a short acoustic intro "Mala tema filma", "Tema groblja" (which is done in a gothic vocal manner) and "Tema fabrike" (an instrumental version of the Čokolada track "Udri bogataša"), "Ljubavna tema" and "Bluz". The most notable tracks are "Ona to zna" and "Ljubavi" released on a single given away as a present with a copy of Džuboks magazine.

Track listing

Personnel 
 Vlada Divljan — guitar, piano, vocals
 Srđan Šaper — vocals
 Mišo Kovač — vocals
 Jahija Gračanlić — vocals on "Ja je zovem meni da se vrati"
 Zdenko Kolar — bass
 Branko Isaković — bass
 Dragomir Mihajlović Gagi — guitar
 Kokan Popović — drums
 Ivan Stančić Piko — drums
 Boban Đorđević — drums
 Đorđe Petrović — keyboards
 Dragan Ilić — keyboards
 Vuk Vujačić — saxophone

Sources and references 

 EX YU ROCK enciklopedija 1960-2006,  Janjatović Petar;  
 Vlada Divljan interview (Serbian)

External links

Idoli albums
1985 soundtrack albums
Film soundtracks
Jugoton soundtracks
Serbian-language albums